The 1941–42 UCLA Bruins men's basketball team represented the University of California, Los Angeles during the 1941–42 NCAA men's basketball season and were members of the Pacific Coast Conference. The Bruins were led by third year head coach Wilbur Johns. They finished the regular season with a record of 5–18 and were fourth in the PCC southern division with a record of 2–10.

Previous season

The Bruins finished the regular season with a record of 6–20 and were fourth in the PCC southern division with a record of 2–10.

Roster

Schedule

|-
!colspan=9 style=|Regular Season

References

UCLA Bruins men's basketball seasons
Ucla
UCLA Bruins Basketball
UCLA Bruins Basketball